Qaleh-ye Hoseynabad (also Romanized as Qal‘eh-ye Ḩoseynābād) is a village in Charuymaq-e Sharqi Rural District, Shadian District, Charuymaq County, East Azerbaijan Province, Iran. At the 2006 census, its population was 465, in 78 families.

References 

Populated places in Charuymaq County